Karen Nystrom (born June 17, 1969) was a member of the 1998 Canadian National women's team that participated in ice hockey at the 1998 Winter Olympics.

Playing career
Prior to joining the Canadian National women's team for the 1992 Women's World ice hockey championships, Nystrom participated in the Central Ontario Women's Hockey League. Nystrom competed for the Scarborough Firefighters (1985 to 1991) and the Toronto Redwings. Prior to the 1998 Olympics, Nystrom also played hockey for the Northeastern Huskies women's ice hockey program. She would play with the Brampton Thunder from 1997 to 2003. During the 2000–01 NWHL season, Nystrom played with the Brampton Thunder and finished fourth in league scoring with 48 points.

Other
Karen Nystrom was also a soccer player who competed for Scarborough United. In 2006, Nystrom was hired as an assistant coach at the University of Ontario Institute of Technology in Oshawa, Ontario. Prior to accepting the job, she had worked for over 10 years as a customer service manager for Nike Canada. In March 2009, she would become the head coach.

Career stats

Awards and honours
Won COWHL scoring title in 1991-92 (runner-up in 1990–91, 1992–93 and
1996–97)
 COWHL All-Star Team every year from 1989 to 1997
 OWHA champion with Scarborough Firefighters, 1991

References

External links 
 
 

1969 births
Living people
Brampton Thunder players
Canadian women's ice hockey forwards
Ice hockey players at the 1998 Winter Olympics
Medalists at the 1998 Winter Olympics
Northeastern Huskies women's ice hockey players
Olympic ice hockey players of Canada
Olympic medalists in ice hockey
Olympic silver medalists for Canada
Sportspeople from Scarborough, Toronto
Ice hockey people from Toronto